Somsavat Lengsavad (born 15 June 1945) is a former Deputy Prime Minister of Laos.  An ethnic Chinese, Chinese name: 凌绪光 (Lin Xuguang), who hails from Luang Prabang with ancestry from Hainan, he was a protégé of Kaysone Phomvihane.

In 1961 he joined the Lao People's Revolutionary Party and fought in the Laotian Civil War.

He became foreign minister in 1993 and served until 8 June 2006, when he was replaced by Thongloun Sisoulith.

He is fluent in Standard Chinese.

References

Laotian people of Chinese descent
1945 births
Members of the 5th Central Committee of the Lao People's Revolutionary Party
Members of the 6th Central Committee of the Lao People's Revolutionary Party
Members of the 7th Central Committee of the Lao People's Revolutionary Party
Members of the 8th Central Committee of the Lao People's Revolutionary Party
Members of the 9th Central Committee of the Lao People's Revolutionary Party
Members of the 8th Politburo of the Lao People's Revolutionary Party
Members of the 9th Politburo of the Lao People's Revolutionary Party
Living people
Lao People's Revolutionary Party politicians
Deputy Prime Ministers of Laos
Foreign ministers of Laos